Sollefteå HK, also sometimes referred to as Sollefteå Hockey, is a Swedish ice hockey club which, plays in Division 1, the third tier of ice hockey in Sweden.  The team's most successful era came in the 1980s when they played in Sweden's second-tier league.

External links
 Official website
 Profile on Eliteprospects.com

Ice hockey teams in Sweden
Sport in Sollefteå
Ice hockey clubs established in 1977
1977 establishments in Sweden
Ice hockey teams in Västernorrland County